Jouko Antero Parviainen (born 4 March 1958 in Kuopio) was a Finnish nordic combined skier who competed from 1985 to 1988. He finished seventh in the 3 x 10 km team event at the 1988 Winter Olympics in Calgary.

Parviainen's best career finish was fourth in a 15 km individual World Cup event in Canada in 1986.

External links
3 x 10 km Olympic results: 1988-2002 

1958 births
Living people
People from Kuopio
Finnish male Nordic combined skiers
Nordic combined skiers at the 1988 Winter Olympics
Olympic Nordic combined skiers of Finland
Sportspeople from North Savo
20th-century Finnish people